Robin Lenk (born 27 March 1984) is a German former football player and manager.

References

External links

1984 births
Living people
People from Würzburg (district)
Sportspeople from Lower Franconia
German footballers
German football managers
Association football midfielders
Chemnitzer FC players
1. FC Kaiserslautern II players
FC Erzgebirge Aue players
FC Erzgebirge Aue managers
FSV Zwickau managers
Regionalliga players
3. Liga players
2. Bundesliga managers
3. Liga managers
Footballers from Bavaria